Michael Wayne Rogers (born September 7, 1978) is an American politician from the state of Oklahoma. He served as Oklahoma's 35th Secretary of State.

Rogers attended Artesia High School in Artesia, New Mexico, and was an all-state athlete in baseball, basketball, and football. He enrolled at Oral Roberts University, and played college baseball for the Oral Roberts Golden Eagles as a pitcher. He played Minor League Baseball for the Cleveland Indians organization until an arm injury ended his career. He became the athletic director of Summit Christian Academy in Broken Arrow, Oklahoma. Under his administration, Summit Christian was admitted into the Oklahoma Secondary School Activities Association. He was hired as director of development for Oral Roberts University in 2018.

Rogers was elected to the Oklahoma House of Representatives in 2014. In 2018, he opted not to seek reelection. Governor Kevin Stitt appointed Rogers as Oklahoma Secretary of State in January 2019 and he served in that position until October 2020.

References

External links

1978 births
Baseball pitchers
Living people
Mahoning Valley Scrappers players
Republican Party members of the Oklahoma House of Representatives
Oral Roberts Golden Eagles baseball players
People from Andrews, Texas
Secretaries of State of Oklahoma